Wasaka is a genus of African corinnid sac spiders first described by C. R. Haddad in 2013.

Species
 it contains four species:
Wasaka imitatrix Haddad, 2013 – Tanzania
Wasaka montana Haddad, 2013 – Burundi, Rwanda, Uganda
Wasaka occulta Haddad, 2013 (type) – Tanzania
Wasaka ventralis Haddad, 2013 – Cameroon

References

Araneomorphae genera

Corinnidae